Harold Leslie Tapping (14 May 1901 – 6 September 1964) was an Australian politician who represented the South Australian House of Assembly seat of Semaphore from 1946 to 1964 for the Labor Party.

References

1901 births
1964 deaths
Members of the South Australian House of Assembly
Australian Labor Party members of the Parliament of South Australia
20th-century Australian politicians